Nicholas Desmond John Smith (born 14 January 1960) is a Welsh Labour Party politician serving as Member of Parliament (MP) for Blaenau Gwent since 2010. From 1998 to 2006 he was a councillor in the London Borough of Camden.

Early life
Born in 1960 into a family of miners and steel workers, Smith grew up in Tredegar and was educated at its comprehensive school. As a young man Nick was a member of  the Tredegar Workman's Hall Snooker Club. Now he co-chairs the parliamentary group in support of the sport. Nick went on to study at Birkbeck College, University of London, where he graduated with an MSc in Economic Change.

Career
Smith became a Labour Party organiser in Wales, and later worked around the world as an International Democracy Adviser, for the Democratic Party in the United States, and for the Westminster Foundation for Democracy. His first significant job for the Labour Party was as agent for Frank Dobson in Holborn and St Pancras, and he later acted as agent for Emily Thornberry in her narrow victory in Islington South and Finsbury at the 2005 general election. He was an officer at the Labour Party's national headquarters from 1993 to 1998, where he was responsible for Labour's membership drive.

Smith was first elected to Camden London Borough Council in 1998, and was re-elected as a councillor in 2002. In 2003, he was appointed as the council's Cabinet member for Education, a post which he continued to hold for some months during 2005 while serving as Secretary General of the European Parliamentary Labour Party, in Brussels. From there, he became Campaigns Manager for the National Society for the Prevention of Cruelty to Children, and his last full-time job before his arrival in the House of Commons was as Director of Policy and Partnerships at the Royal College of Speech and Language Therapists.

Smith was selected as Labour's prospective parliamentary candidate for Blaenau Gwent in 2007 and was elected as its Member of Parliament on 6 May 2010, defeating the incumbent Independent Dai Davies. Davies criticised Smith's record in Camden, calling him a product of "Blairite New Labour", while Smith had responded by calling this "personal mud-slinging" and "playing the man and not the ball".

In one of the strongest showings for Labour in Wales, Nick Smith won by more than 10,000 votes on a 61.94 percent turnout. Voter turnout was up by 19.6 percent from the previous election in 2006.

The 20.1 percentage point increase in the Labour share of the vote was higher than in any other seat in Britain. The swing from Independent to Labour was 29.2 per cent, the largest in the UK.

On his election success, Smith commented "The local population and the Blaenau Gwent Labour Party have shared values, and that's come through in this result tonight." He also said he had promised Michael Foot he would return Blaenau Gwent to Labour.

In the 2015 general election Smith increased his majority to 58% of the share of the vote, gaining 18,380 votes (+5.6%). Blaenau Gwent now has the highest Labour share of the vote in Wales. The July 2017 general election produced almost a replica of the result two years earlier, with Smith taking 58% of the vote and winning 18,787 votes. Speaking after the announcement, Smith said: "Today the voters of Blaenau Gwent shared my belief that our best hope to get our country moving again is a Labour government. Blaenau Gwent needs more jobs, improved transport, proper funding for our frontline services and only a Labour government in Westminster can do that."

Nick Smith campaigned against leaving the European Union. This was contrary to the desires of his constituency, Blaenau Gwent, who voted to leave and were labelled "Wales' most pro-Brexit town".

In the December 2019 general election Smith won the seat once more, with 14,862 votes (49.18% of those cast), ahead of Richard Taylor (of the Brexit Party) who took 6,215 votes, Laura Jones (Conservative) on 5,749 and Peredur Owen Griffiths (Plaid Cymru) on 1,722. Smith said he was delighted to be elected for his third term but acknowledged that it had been a difficult night for the Labour party as a whole. He said: "I'm extremely grateful to be voted in by the people of Blaenau Gwent, but I'm sad that we're going to have to put up with a Tory rampant administration for the next five years. "I'm going to work very hard here now to make sure to keep up my good community links and make sure we build the party to come back stronger." Smith was an early supporter of Keir Starmer in his Labour leadership bid in 2020.

Member of Parliament
Blaenau Gwent is a seat with a strong Labour heritage. Aneurin Bevan, the post-war Health Minister responsible for creating the National Health Service, and Michael Foot, a former leader of the Labour Party, both held the seat in the second half of the twentieth century. Smith's campaign formed the subject of a Progress pamphlet entitled "Organising to Win" which highlighted the successful tactics he had used to win back the seat for Labour.

Smith made his maiden speech in Parliament on 8 June 2010. He praised the cultural and political heritage of the constituency, and promised to campaign strongly on improving public health, the prospects for young people, and economic growth. As a backbench member, he has led the call for the Government to respond to the collapse of care home provider Southern Cross, bringing the Minister of Health responsible for care services, Paul Burstow, to answer questions before the House, and raising the issue with David Cameron at Prime Minister's Questions.

In 2013, he continued his care home campaigning after the collapse of Operation Jasmine, an £11m seven-year investigation into neglect and abuse in care homes in South Wales. He backed the "Justice for Jasmine" campaign and calls for both a review into the case. He also called for the Care Bill going through parliament to include an amendment that would allow care home owners to be prosecuted for instances of neglect under their care. The Welsh Government announced an Independent Review into the case in December 2013. The Criminal Justice and Courts Bill in 2014 was amended to include laws so staff, managers and directors could face jail sentences for abuse and wilful neglect in their care – with the companies being fined and publicly named for their role in any abuse.

On entering Parliament, Smith was elected to the influential Public Accounts Committee, responsible for monitoring value for money in public spending. He has highlighted a number of instances of the Ministry of Defence wasting tax payer's money, including changes to the requirements of the two s that added billions of pounds to the cost of the contracts. Since his election, he has highlighted the "pathetic" tax contributions of the likes of Amazon, who paid £2.4m in UK tax in 2012 despite £4.3bn in sales.

He gained early promotion when Douglas Alexander, Shadow Foreign Secretary, appointed him as his Parliamentary Private Secretary and a junior member of Labour's Foreign Affairs team. In September 2015, Smith was promoted to the Shadow DEFRA team as the Minister for Food, Farming and Rural Affairs. He resigned on 29 June 2016, saying that Jeremy Corbyn did not have the leadership skills needed. He supported Owen Smith in the 2016 Labour Party (UK) leadership election. After the election Smith was appointed as an Opposition Whip. Smith was the Labour Whip and Teller, reading the result to Parliament when Prime Minister May's Brexit deal fell to a record breaking defeat.

Smith's campaigns have included criticising the interest rates that poor families are charged by the rent-to-own sector for buying household appliances. He accused companies of charging "staggering" interest rates for goods such as fridges and washing machines. The Financial Conduct Authority announced in May 2018 that it was considering a cap on the sector, a move Smith called "a big step forward".

Since 2017, Smith has championed local steelworkers affected by the British Steel Pension Scheme scandal, including many across South Wales. In 2022, he led the Public Accounts Committee's investigation into the scandal, which found that the Financial Conduct Authority had failed to protect British Steel pension scheme members causing “serious financial harm”, which Smith added showed "how badly they were treated, and where the FCA failed to support them in their hour of need.".

He served on the Progress Strategy Board from 2012 to 2014. He is a current member of the Tribune Group.

Smith ran his first London Marathon in 2018 for Hospice of the Valleys, a Blaenau Gwent charity who provide palliative care. He has since campaigned on more support for initiatives such as Parkrun and efforts to tackle childhood obesity such as a ban on junk food advertising before 9pm. Smith chairs the All Party Parliamentary Group on Parkrun and has promoted physical activity for improved public health and to help address obesity.

Personal life
Smith has two daughters and lives in Nantyglo. He married fellow Labour MP Jenny Chapman in July 2014. He previously lived in Camden Town.  

Smith is a keen hiker, and is the President of his borough's Red Ramblers organisation. He is also President of Ebbw Valley Brass. Nick is a member of the Parc Bryn Bach Running Club in Tredegar  and chairs the parliamentary group in support of Parkrun.

See also
2006 Blaenau Gwent by-elections

References

External links
 Nick Smith MP official constituency website

1960 births
Living people
People from Tredegar
Alumni of Birkbeck, University of London
Welsh Labour Party MPs
Councillors in the London Borough of Camden
Labour Party (UK) councillors
UK MPs 2010–2015
UK MPs 2015–2017
UK MPs 2017–2019
UK MPs 2019–present
National Society for the Prevention of Cruelty to Children people
Spouses of life peers